Spokane Creek is a census-designated place (CDP) in Broadwater County, Montana, United States. The population was 355 at the 2010 census.

Geography

Demographics

References

Census-designated places in Broadwater County, Montana
Census-designated places in Montana